The , also known as the  or , consist of the Izu and Ogasawara (also known as Bonin) island chains to the south of the Izu Peninsula.

Overview
The islands consist of two towns and seven villages that are grouped into four subprefectures.

List of towns and villages

References

Islands of Tokyo